 was a Japanese photographer. He won the Ina Nobuo Award in 1986 and had a major retrospective at the Tokyo Metropolitan Museum of Photography in 2000.

Life and work
Nagano was born in Ōita City in Ōita Prefecture, and studied economics at Keio University (Tokyo). On graduating, he joined a trading company, but soon resigned. He was recruited by Natori Yōnosuke for Weekly Sun News (Shūkan San Nyūsu); and in 1949 moved to Iwanami Shoten where, again under Natori, he did the photography for about fifty of the slim volumes in Iwanami Shashin Bunko. In 1954 he went freelance, concentrating on magazine work. 

During the 1960s Nagano observed the period of intense economic growth in Japan, depicting the lives of Tokyo's sarariman with some humor. The photographs of this period were only published in book form much later, as Dorīmu eiji and 1960 (1978 and 1990 respectively).

In 1964 Nagano worked on the cinemaphotography for Ichikawa Kon's film Tokyo Olympiad, and he then moved to work in film and television, particularly television commercials. 

Nagano exhibited recent examples of his street photography in 1986, winning the Ina Nobuo Award. He published several books of his works since then, and won a number of awards. Nagano had a major retrospective at the Tokyo Metropolitan Museum of Photography in 2000.

Nagano died two months short of his 94th birthday, on January 30, 2019.

Books of Nagano's works

Iwanami Shashin Bunko. Tokyo: Iwanami.  Nagano is reputed to have done the photography for 50 or 60 of this large set. They include:
 Kamakura. 1950. Reprint: Tokyo: Iwanami, 1988. . The reprint names Nagano as photographer.
 Nagasaki. 1951. 
 Hiroshima. 1952. 
Kogai satsuei jōtatsu 50 no hiketsu. Tokyo: Genkōsha, 1954. 
Dokyumentarī shashin. Gendai Kamera Shinsho 30. Tokyo: Asahi Sonorama, 1977.  
Dorīmu eiji / Japan's Dream Age. Sonorama Shashin Sensho 10. Tokyo: Asahi Sonorama, 1978.  A new edition of Nagano's photographs of urban Japan in the period of high growth.
Yoru no byōin / The Hospital at Night. . Tokyo: Fukuinkan, 1979.  Nagano provides the photographs for this slim children's book, whose text (all in hiragana) is by Tanikawa Shuntarō.
 Tokyo: Fukuinkan, 1985. . 
Inka teikoku no zanshō: Shinbi to roman to sono matsuei. Tokyo: IBC, 1988. . 
Tōi shisen: 1980–1989 Tokyo / A Strange Perspective in Tokyo. Tokyo: IBC, 1989. . 
1960: Nagano Shigeichi shashinshū. Tokyo: Heibonsha, 1990. .  Nagano's black and white photographs taken in 1960 of Berlin and Japan.
Taiheiki: Shashin kikō. Tokyo: IBC, 1991.  .
Nagano Shigeichi sakuhinten: 1960 Berurin Nihon. JCII Photo Salon Library 7. Tokyo: JCII Photo Salon, 1991.  Exhibition catalogue.  
Tōkyō kōjitsu. Tokyo: Heibonsha, 1995. .  Captions give the location in Japanese script and the year; also with an essay in Japanese.
Jidai no kioku 1945–1995: Nagano Shigeichi shashinshū. Tokyo: Asahi Shinbunsha, 1995. . 
Nagano Shigeichi. Nihon no Shashinka. Tokyo: Iwanami, 1999. .  A survey of Nagano's work.
Kono kuni no kioku: Nagano Shigeichi, shashin no shigoto / A Chronicle of Japan: Nagano Shigeichi: A Life in Photography. Tokyo: Nihon Shashin Kikaku, 2000. .  Catalogue of an exhibition held at the Tokyo Metropolitan Museum of Photography, 2000. Captions are in English as well as Japanese; other text is in Japanese only.
Tōi shisen / Distant Gaze. Tokyo: Wides, 2001. . 
Nagano Shigeichi. Hysteric 14. Tokyo: Hysteric Glamour, 2005.   Photographs 1949–59, 2001–2004. Captions in Japanese and English.
 Tōkyō 1950 nendai (Tokyo in the 1950s). Tokyo: Iwanami, 2007. .  Photographs of the streets of Tokyo. With an essay by Saburō Kawamoto.
Tōi shisen: Gentō / Distant Gaze: Dark Blossom of Winter. Tokyo: Sokyu-sha, 2008. 
Honkon tsuioku / Hongkong  Reminiscence 1958. Tokyo: Sokyu-sha, 2009.  Photographs of Hong Kong taken in 1958. Short texts in Japanese and English, captions in Japanese only.
Magajin wāku 60 nendai / Magazine Work 60s. Tokyo: Life Goes On & Taxi (distrib. Heibonsha), 2009. .  Works published (or intended for publication) in magazines, 1958–1971. Text in Japanese and English.

Works with contributions by Nagano
Densha ni miru toshi fūkei 1981–2006 ( / Scenes of Tokyo City: Prospects from the Train 1981–2006. Tama City, Tokyo: Tama City Cultural Foundation Parthenon Tama, 2006. Exhibition catalogue.  Captions and text in Japanese and English.
Feustel, Marc. Japanese Postwar Photography, Hamaya Hiroshi, Nagano Shigeichi and Tanuma Takeyoshi. Paris: Studio Equis, 2005.
Feustel, Marc. Eyes of an Island, Japanese Photography 1945–2007. Paris: Studio Equis, 2007.
Hiraki, Osamu, and Keiichi Takeuchi. Japon, un autoportrait: Photographies 1945–1964. Paris: Flammarion, 2004. .
Japan, a Self-Portrait: Photographs 1945–1964. Paris: Flammarion, 2004. .
Nihon no "jigazō", 1945–1964. Tokyo: Iwanami Shoten, 2004. .
Nihon no jigazō: Shashin ga egaku sengo, 1945–1964. Tokyo: Kurevisu, 2009.
Iwanami Shoten Henshūbu. Tachiagaru Hiroshima 1952. Tokyo: Iwanami Shoten, 2013. . Nagano is credited as one of the small number of photographers.
Nihon shashin no tenkan: 1960 nendai no hyōgen / Innovation in Japanese Photography in the 1960s. Tokyo: Tokyo Metropolitan Museum of Photography, 1991.  Exhibition catalogue, text in Japanese and English. Pp.90–97 show photographs from the series "Dream Age".
Shashin toshi Tōkyō / Tokyo/City of Photos. Tokyo: Tokyo Metropolitan Museum of Photography, 1995. Catalogue of an exhibition held in 1995. Captions and texts in both Japanese and English.
Tōkyō: Toshi no shisen / Tokyo: A city perspective. Tokyo: Tokyo Metropolitan Museum of Photography, 1990.  Captions and text in Japanese and English.

References

 Nihon shashinka jiten / 328 Outstanding Japanese Photographers. Kyoto: Tankōsha, 2000. .
Orto, Luisa. "Nagano Shigeichi." In Anne Wilkes Tucker, et al., The History of Japanese Photography. New Haven: Yale University Press, 2003. .

External links
Samples of work by Nagano hosted by Fujifilm (click on the titles to see more)  
Chronologies of Nagano's life and works hosted by Fujifilm  
Ono, Philbert. Review of Kono kuni no kioku / A Chronicle of Japan. 
Sample pages from Magazine Work 60s.

Japanese photographers
Japanese cinematographers
Photography in China
1925 births
2019 deaths
People from Ōita (city)
Street photographers